Stuart Perry and William Swezey Houses, are two historic homes located at Newport in Herkimer County, New York.  They were built in the late 1840s to plans by Alexander Jackson Davis.  They are largely identical Italian Villa style, asymmetrical plan, masonry dwellings.  They consist of a hipped roof block, centrally placed tower, and gable ended block.

The Perry house has also been known, at various times in its history, as Riverview and The Three Islands.  The Swezey house has been known as the Green Tea Cup Inn and Villa Newlife. The two houses were listed on the National Register of Historic Places in 2012.

References

Houses on the National Register of Historic Places in New York (state)
Houses completed in 1849
Italianate architecture in New York (state)
Houses in Herkimer County, New York
National Register of Historic Places in Herkimer County, New York